Forging Ahead is the fourth album by British 2 Tone and ska band Bad Manners from the year 1982. It was the group's last album on Magnet Records. The picture sleeve to the right, is of the American edition of the album that was released two years later in 1984, with a slightly different track list to the official UK issue.

American Track listing
All songs by Bad Manners unless noted.

 "That'll Do Nicely" – 2:52
 "Salad Bar" – 2:51
 "Tonight Is Your Night" – 3:25
 "Samson and Delilah (Biblical Version)" – 5:18
 "Exodus" (Ernest Gold) – 2:45
 "Got No Brains" – 3:48
 "My Girl Lollipop" (Morris Levy, Johnny Roberts) – 4:59
 "Falling Out of Love" – 3:23
 "Seventh Heaven" – 3:28
 "Educating Marmalade" – 3:16
 "What's Up Crazy Pup" (Van Morrison) – 1:56
 "Your" – 3:49

2011 Release: UK Album And Bonus Tracks

 "Salad Bar" – 2:51
 "Tonight is Your Night" – 3:25
 "Samson and Delilah" (Biblical Version) – 5:16
 "Exodus" – 2:46 
 "Got No Brains" – 3:49
 "Rose of Italy" – 3:36
 "My Girl Lollipop" (Extended Lick Mix) – 4:58
 "Falling Out of Love" – 3:24
 "Seventh Heaven" – 3:28
 "Educating Marmalade" – 3:16
 "What's Up Crazy Pup" – 1:57
 "Your" – 3:52
 "Psychedelic Eric" – 3:37
 "Flashpoint" – 3:47
 "Ben E. Wriggle" (Remix) – 6:06
 "My Girl Lollipop (Single Version) – 2:45
 "Samson and Delilah" (Single Version) – 3:32
 "Good Honest Man" – 2:12
 "Your" (Instrumental Version) – 3:27
 "That'll Do Nicely" – 2:52
 "Monster Love" (Dub) – 2:58
 "That'll Do Nicely" (Express Version) – 4:49

Personnel
Buster Bloodvessel – Lead Vocals
Louis Alphonso – Guitar
David Farren – Bass
Martin Stewart – Keyboards
Brian Tuitt – Drums
Chris Kane – Tenor Saxophone
Andrew Marson – Alto Saxophone, Banjo
Paul "Gus" Hyman – Trumpet
Winston Bazoomies – Harmonica, Backing Vocals
Roger Lomas – Producer
Ted Sharp – Engineer
Recorded at Rockfield Studios, Monmouth, Wales

1982 albums
Bad Manners albums
Magnet Records albums
Albums recorded at Rockfield Studios